Jana Novotná and Helena Suková were the defending champions but only Novotná competed that year with Catarina Lindqvist.

Lindqvist and Novotná lost in the semifinals to Louise Allen and Laura Gildemeister.

Steffi Graf and Pam Shriver won in the final 6–2, 6–4 against Allen and Gildemeister.

Seeds
Champion seeds are indicated in bold text while text in italics indicates the round in which those seeds were eliminated.

 Steffi Graf /  Pam Shriver (champions)
 Catarina Lindqvist /  Jana Novotná (semifinals)
 Sandy Collins /  Andrea Temesvári (first round)
 Mary Lou Daniels /  Wendy White (semifinals)

Draw

External links
 1989 United Jersey Bank Classic Doubles Draw

WTA New Jersey
1989 WTA Tour
1989 in sports in New Jersey